Sportanlange Leitawies is a football stadium in Triesenberg, Liechtenstein. It is the home ground of FC Triesenberg and has a capacity of 800 made up of 400 seats and 400 standing places.

References

See also
 List of football stadiums in Liechtenstein

Football venues in Liechtenstein